1-(2-Chloro-N-methylbenzimidoyl)cyclopentanol, sometimes misleadingly referred to as hydroxylimine hydrochloride, is a chemical compound which is the final intermediate in the synthesis of ketamine, an anaesthetic drug which is also subject to recreational abuse. This chemical intermediate is not active as a drug in its own right, and is legal in most countries, but is readily converted into ketamine by dissolving it in a suitable high-boiling point solvent and heating, with no other chemicals required. This has made it subject to illicit trade as a drug precursor, and it has sometimes been seized by law enforcement agencies in significant quantities, leading to it being specifically banned as a controlled drug precursor in some jurisdictions such as Taiwan.

See also
 1,6-Dioxecane-2,7-dione
 Alprazolam triazolobenzophenone

References 

Illegal drug trade
Imines